Abbie Wood (born 2 March 1999) is a British swimmer from Buxton.

Biography
Wood was born in 1999 and she is from Buxton in Derbyshire. She is a student of Loughborough University.
She competed in the women's 4 × 100 metre freestyle relay event at the 2020 European Aquatics Championships, in Budapest, Hungary, winning the gold medal.

Wood was named as a member of the British team to go to the postponed 2020 Olympics in April 2021. This was her first Olympics where she joined an "exceptionally high quality" swimming team including Jacob Whittle, Sarah Vasey and Molly Renshaw who are all from Derbyshire and we’re also at their first Olympics.

As part of the 2021 International Swimming League, Wood was selected to the roster of team New York Breakers.

Awards and honours
 SwimSwam Top 100 (Women's): 2021 (#85)

References

External links
 
 
 
 
 
 

1999 births
Living people
British female swimmers
British female freestyle swimmers
Place of birth missing (living people)
Swimmers at the 2015 European Games
European Games medalists in swimming
European Games gold medalists for Great Britain
European Games silver medalists for Great Britain
European Games bronze medalists for Great Britain
Swimmers at the 2018 Commonwealth Games
Swimmers at the 2022 Commonwealth Games
Commonwealth Games medallists in swimming
Commonwealth Games silver medallists for England
Commonwealth Games bronze medallists for England
European Aquatics Championships medalists in swimming
Swimmers at the 2020 Summer Olympics
Olympic swimmers of Great Britain
21st-century British women
People from Buxton
Sportspeople from Derbyshire
Medallists at the 2022 Commonwealth Games